Real Club Deportivo España, Real España, or simply España is a Honduran professional football club, which plays in the Liga Nacional de Fútbol de Honduras. With 12 championships, Real España is one of the most accomplished Honduran football clubs, and its popularity is recognized outside of Honduras' boundaries. Their title of Real (Royal) was awarded by King Juan Carlos I of Spain in 1977.  

They are based in San Pedro Sula, Cortés, and their home venue is the Estadio General Francisco Morazán.

History
Real España was founded on 14 July 1929 at Escuela Ramón Rosa, de San Pedro Sula by Pastor Reyes, Juan Banegas, "Teco" Lardizábal, Hugo Escoto Soto and Leonardo Muñoz as Club Deportivo España.

Their professional history begins in 1965–66, with the founding of the Honduran national league.  For most of the league's first decade, Los Aurinegros were a mid-table side.  However, in the early 1970s, things began to change.  The team was anchored by defender Jaime Villegas, who would play for Real España from 1970 to 1986, and make a club record 306 appearances.  In 1974, the addition of two new faces, keeper Julio César Arzú and striker Jimmy James Bailey, turned the team into title contenders for the first time.  The team finished third in the regular season's table, which was good enough to qualify them for a quadrangular tournament, a round robin with the league's top four teams.  Real España won this phase, forcing a championship playoff with regular season champions Motagua.  Antonio Pavón Molina scored the lone goal of their 1–0 victory, making Los Aurinegros champions of Honduras for the very first time.

In 1975, la Máquina got even stronger.  They added a defensive midfielder named Gilberto Yearwood, who would eventually be considered one of the greatest Honduran players of all time.  On the pitch, they enjoyed similar results, finishing third in the regular table, winning the quadrangular playoff, and earning a championship playoff with Olimpia.  The teams drew the first leg 0–0, but Real España won the second leg 2–0, with goals from Alberto Ferreira da Silva and Gilberto Yearwood.

1976 saw the club climb to an even higher level.  They won the regular season championship with 38 points (15 wins in 27 matches) and only narrowly finished second to Motagua in the quadrangular (had they won, there would have been no need for a championship playoff).  In the resulting playoff, the teams drew 0–0 in the first leg, played at Motagua's stadium in Tegucigalpa.  Back in San Pedro Sula, the story was different.  Real España dominated, winning the match 4–1 and clinching their third straight championship.  It was known as "el tricampeon", and it was the first such accomplishment in the history of Honduran soccer (it would not be equalled until Olimpia managed it in the late 1990s).

After this, international attention was descending on the club for the first time.  Yearwood, who had starred in the 1977 FIFA World Youth Championship for Honduras, moved abroad and would spend ten years playing in Spain's La Liga.  King Juan Carlos I of Spain bestowed the Real title on the club the following summer.  Things were looking up.

In 1977, the club set out in search of an unprecedented fourth consecutive title.  They finished third in the regular season and won the quadrangular, only to bow 2–0 to Olimpia in the championship playoff.  They reached the championship round again in 1978–79, but were once again defeated, this time by Motagua.  Then, in 1979, disaster.  Real España's form collapsed and they plummeted to 8th in the league.  Worse, crosstown rivals Marathón won the championship.

They set out to redeem this in 1980, winning the regular season championship with 14 wins in 27 matches.  In the pentagonal round robin, though, things became complex—Olimpia, Marathón, and Real España were all tied at the top of the table, forcing a second round-robin between those three.  Real España had the chance to win the championship then and there, but after every match ended in a draw, the pentagonal title was awarded to Marathón on goal difference.  That set up an all-San Pedro Sula championship match.

The teams split the first two legs, forcing a decisive third playoff match.  With all of San Pedro Sula watching in anticipation, Real brought home their fourth title by a 2–1 scoreline.  This was the end of Real's golden era.  Their glory side was beginning to age, and Olimpia was ascending to the dominant heights of Honduran football.  It was not until the late 1980s that a revival would begin.

After near misses in 1986 and 1987, Real reclaimed their glory in 1988 by winning the regular season championship and then beating Olimpia in an extra time playoff final to claim their fifth title.  1989–90 saw the two teams meet again in the championship final, which ended level; Olimpia was awarded the crown on the basis of a superior regular season record.  Real, however, was not finished—they came right back by beating Motagua 2–1 to win the 1990–91 championship.  Rodolfo Richardson Smith was the hero, scoring a double in the second leg of the finals.  La máquina  only narrowly missed a second consecutive crown when they bowed to Motagua in the 1991–92 title match.

Two years later, in 1993–94, Real España hoisted their seventh championship in the most dominant style of all, by winning both the regular season and triangular playoff.  No championship match was necessary in this most impressive season; out of 31 domestic matches, la maquina had lost just once.  The leader of the charge that season was Carlos Pavón, an 18-year-old striker who was attracting all sorts of international attention.  Pavón would leave after the season to spend a decade abroad, playing in Mexico and Italy.  Real, meanwhile, entered a decade long title drought.

Their return to glory came in Apertura 2003, under the managerial leadership of Juan de Dios Castillo.  Castillo had built his team around two Brazilian strikers, Pedrinho and Luciano Emilio, and it paid off.  Luciano Emilio won the league scoring title, and each scored in the championship final, which saw Real España defeat Olimpia 4–2 on aggregate.

However, the glory was fleeting.  Diaz Castillo left for Marathon, while Olimpia signed Luciano Emilio and used his talents to win four out of the next five titles.  Those were frustrating times, as Real missed the championship playoffs four tournaments in a row.  It was not until Clausura 2007 that the club returned to form.

Under Mexican manager José Treviño, the club won the regular season title and stormed into the playoffs.  Treviño had a strong team--Carlos Pavón had returned from Europe, and was joined at striker by Milton Núñez and the Brazilian Esvaldo Ferreira.  A victory over Motagua earned them a berth in the finals against crosstown rivals Marathon.  Marathon won the first leg, 2–1, which set up a dramatic championship showdown.  With just thirteen minutes left in the last leg, the teams were level, 1–1, which would have given Marathon a win on aggregate.  However, Milton Núñez scored a brilliant goal to even the tie, then used his perfect aerial pass to set up Ferreira for the winning goal.  Real España were champions of Honduras for the ninth time.

The club finished runners up in both Apertura 2008 and Clausura 2009, but returned to the top in dramatic style in Apertura 2010.  A double from attacking midfielder Luis Lobo lifted the club to a semi-final win over Marathon, and in the finals they defeated Olimpia in extra time.  They won it again in Apertura 2013, beating Real Sociedad on penalties, and then again in Apertura 2017, holding off Motagua in extra time.

Colours and badge

España's colours are black and yellow, a fact reflected in the club's nickname: Aurinegros (a compound word meaning gold and black). The club logo was changed in 2006 to give a younger, more fresh look. The club mascot has changed many times.  It has been a yellow and black owl, a train, and most recently a robot. The crown symbolizes the "royal status" granted to the club by the King of Spain. This is noticeable in other clubs such as Real Madrid, Real Sociedad, Real Betis, Real Murcia, Real Valladolid and Real Zaragoza.

Joma is the team's official sportswear manufacturer.

Stadium

Real España plays their home matches at the Estadio Francisco Morazán. It has been Real España's home stadium since its creation. In 2008 Real España played all their home games at the Estadio Olímpico due to the Estadio Morazán's renewal.

Club Rivalries

Clásico Moderno (Honduras)

El Clásico Moderno (The Modern Derby) also referred by some as the Clasico Moderno Hondureño is a Honduran football match played at least four times a year in the Liga Nacional de Honduras and consists of two teams, C.D. Olimpia and Real C.D. España.

Clásico Sampedrano

El Clásico Sampedrano (The Sampedran Derby) is a Honduran football match played at least four times a year in the
Liga Nacional de Fútbol de Honduras and consists of two teams, Marathón and Real España. These two teams are from San Pedro Sula, hence the name.

Motagua–Real España football rivalry

The Motagua–Real España classic is not as fierce as the other two already mentioned as these both teams have a good relationship with each other from the players, to the board and the fans; however they had played six intense league finals, three won by each side.

Achievements
Domestic
Liga Nacional de Fútbol de Honduras: 12
1974, 1975, 1976, 1980, 1988, 1990, 1993, Apertura 2003, Clausura 2007, Apertura 2010, Apertura 2013, Apertura 2017.
Runner-up (10): 1977, 1978, 1986, 1989, 1991, 1995, Apertura 1997, 1998–99, Apertura 2007, Apertura 2008, Apertura 2011 Clausura 2013 Apertura 2018
Honduran Cup: 2
1972, 1992.

International
Copa Fraternidad / Grandes de C.A. / UNCAF Interclub Cup: 2
Champion (2):1981, 1982
Runner-up (1): 1979
Third-place (2): 1998, 2000

CONCACAF Cup Winners Cup: 
Runner-up (1): 1993.

Copa Premier Centroamericana: 
Champion (1): 2019.

Individual club achievements
First "Tri-Campeón" (three time consecutive winner) (1974), (1975), (1976)
Five Consecutive Honduran finals (1974), (1975), (1976), (1977), (1978)

Player records

League and Playoffs Performance
(1994–present)
{|class="wikitable" style="text-align:center"
! Season
! Position
! GP
! W
! D
! L
! GF
! GA
! PTS
! Play-offs
|-
|-
| 1993–94||bgcolor=gold| 1st|| 27|| 14|| 12|| 1|| ?|| ?|| 40||bgcolor=gold| Champions
|-
| 1994–95||bgcolor=#cc9966| 3rd|| 27|| 10|| 9|| 8|| 27|| 23|| 39||bgcolor=DeepSkyBlue| Second round
|-
| 1995–96|| 6th|| 27|| 9|| 9|| 9|| 32|| 33|| 36||bgcolor=silver| Runners-up
|-
| 1996–97|| 6th|| 27|| 8|| 10|| 9|| 24|| 24|| 34||bgcolor=DeepSkyBlue| Second round
|-
| 1997–98 Apertura|| 5th|| 20|| 8|| 8|| 4|| 30|| 26|| 32||bgcolor=Orange| Semi-finals
|-
| 1997–98 Clausura|| 8th|| 20|| 5|| 8|| 7|| 24|| 26|| 23|| did not qualify
|-
| 1999 Apertura|| 4th|| 18|| 5|| 11|| 2|| 24|| 18|| 26||bgcolor=silver| Runners-up
|-
| 1999–00 Apertura|| 9th|| 18|| 4|| 5|| 9|| 13|| 21|| 17|| did not qualify
|-
| 1999–00 Clausura|| 8th|| 18|| 3|| 7|| 8|| 14|| 22|| 16|| did not qualify
|-
| 2000–01 Apertura|| 4th|| 18|| 6|| 6|| 6|| 21|| 24|| 24||bgcolor=Orange| Semi-finals
|-
| 2000–01 Clausura|| 4th|| 18|| 6|| 4|| 8|| 27|| 29|| 22||bgcolor=Orange| Semi-finals
|-
| 2001–02 Apertura|| 5th|| 18|| 5|| 9|| 4|| 21|| 15|| 24|| did not qualify
|-
| 2001–02 Clausura|| 5th|| 18|| 5|| 8|| 5|| 16|| 15|| 23|| did not qualify
|-
| 2002–03 Apertura|| 4th|| 18|| 6|| 8|| 4|| 25|| 18|| 26||bgcolor=Orange| Semi-finals
|-
| 2002–03 Clausura||bgcolor=#cc9966| 3rd|| 18|| 9|| 6|| 3|| 25|| 15|| 33||bgcolor=Orange| Semi-finals
|-
| 2003–04 Apertura||bgcolor=silver| 2nd|| 18|| 10|| 5|| 3|| 36|| 23|| 35||bgcolor=gold| Champions
|-
| 2003–04 Clausura|| 4th|| 16|| 7|| 3|| 6|| 28|| 25|| 24||bgcolor=Orange| Semi-finals
|-
| 2004–05 Apertura||bgcolor=#cc9966| 3rd|| 18|| 9|| 4|| 5|| 23|| 12|| 31||bgcolor=Orange| Semi-finals
|-
| 2004–05 Clausura|| 4th|| 17|| 5|| 7|| 5|| 19|| 18|| 22||bgcolor=Orange| Semi-finals
|-
| 2005–06 Apertura|| 6th|| 18|| 6|| 5|| 7|| 23|| 23|| 23|| did not qualify.
|-
| 2005–06 Clausura|| 6th|| 18|| 5|| 8|| 5|| 15|| 17|| 23|| did not qualify.'
|-
| 2006–07 Apertura|| 7th|| 18|| 5|| 6|| 7|| 18|| 20|| 21|| did not qualify.|-
| 2006–07 Clausura||bgcolor=gold| 1st|| 18|| 11|| 4|| 3|| 27|| 10|| 36||bgcolor=gold| Champions
|-
| 2007–08 Apertura|| 6th|| 18|| 6|| 4|| 8|| 22|| 25|| 22|| did not qualify|-
| 2007–08 Clausura||bgcolor=#cc9966| 3rd|| 18|| 8|| 4|| 6|| 26|| 22|| 28||bgcolor=Orange| Semi-finals
|-
| 2008–09 Apertura||bgcolor=gold| 1st|| 18|| 11|| 5|| 2|| 35|| 17|| 38||bgcolor=silver| Runners-up
|-
| 2008–09 Clausura||bgcolor=#cc9966| 3rd|| 18|| 8|| 6|| 4|| 20|| 12|| 30||bgcolor=silver| Runners-up
|-
| 2009–10 Apertura|| 4th|| 18|| 9|| 3|| 6|| 26|| 20|| 30||bgcolor=Orange| Semi-finals
|-
| 2010–11 Apertura|| 3rd|| 18|| 7|| 7|| 4|| 28|| 18|| 28||bgcolor=Gold| Champions
|-
| 2010–11 Clausura|| 5th|| 18|| 6|| 7|| 5|| 25|| 25|| 25|| did not qualify|-
| 2011–12 Apertura|| 1st|| 18|| 9|| 7|| 2|| 25|| 13|| 34||bgcolor=silver| Runners-up
|-
| 2011–12 Clausura|| 5th|| 18|| 7|| 4|| 7|| 28|| 26|| 25||bgcolor=Orange| Semi-finals
|-
| 2012–13 Apertura|| 6th|| 18|| 5|| 6|| 7|| 21|| 22|| 21|| Quarter-finals
|-
| 2012–13 Clausura|| 8th|| 18|| 5|| 7|| 6|| 18|| 22|| 22|| did not qualify|}

All-Time Table
 As of 13 September 2008

36 Game Average

International competition

CONCACAF Champions' Cup
1975 CONCACAF Champions' Cup
First Round v.  Deportivo Saprissa – 1:4, 2:0 (Saprissa advance 4:3 on aggregate)
1976 CONCACAF Champions' Cup
First Round v.  CD Olimpia – 0:0, 0:1 (Olimpia advance 1:0 on aggregate)
1977 CONCACAF Champions' Cup
Third Round v.  Deportivo Saprissa – (Real España withdrew)
1981 CONCACAF Champions' Cup
First Round v.  Cruz Azul – 2:1, 0:3 (Cruz Azul advance 4:2 on aggregate)
1987 CONCACAF Champions' Cup
First Round v.  Real Verdes – 2:0, 6:1 (Real España advance 8:1 on aggregate)
Second Round v.  Aurora F.C. – 1:0
Second Round v.  Alianza FC – 2:1
Second Round v.  Deportivo Saprissa – 1:3
Third Round v.  CS Herediano – 2:3
Third Round v.  CD Olimpia – 0:1
Third Round v.  Deportivo Saprissa – 1:2
1989 CONCACAF Champions' Cup
First Round v.  Aurora F.C. – 1:1
First Round v.  CS Cartaginés – 1:0
First Round v.  Firpo – 0:0
Second Round v.  CS Herediano – 1:3
Second Round v.  CD Olimpia – 0:3
Second Round v.  CS Cartaginés – 2:0
1990 CONCACAF Champions' Cup
First Round v.  Diriangén FC – 5:1, 2:0 (Real España advance 7:1 on aggregate)
Second Round v.  CSD Municipal – 2:1, 1:0 (Real España advance 3:1 on aggregate)
Third Round v.  Firpo – 0:3
Third Round v.  Firpo – 1:1
Third Round v.  CD Olimpia – 4:1
Third Round v.  CD Olimpia – 0:1
1991 CONCACAF Champions' Cup
First Round v.  Acros Real Verdes – 5:0, 1:0 (Real España advance 6:0 on aggregate)
Second Round v.  Alianza FC – 1:0, 1:1 (Real España advance 2:1 on aggregate)
Third Round v.  LD Alajuelense – 2:0, 1:0 (Real España advance 3:0 on aggregate)
Final Round v.  Deportivo Saprissa – 2:1, 2:0 (Real España advance 4:1 on aggregate)
Semi-finals v.  Police FC – 0:0, 0:1 (Police advance 1:0 on aggregate)
1992 CONCACAF Champions' Cup
First Round v.  Águila – 0:0, 3:1 (Real España advance 3:1 on aggregate)
Third Round v.  San Francisco Bay Blackhawks – 0:3, 0:3 (San Francisco Bay Blackhawks advance 6:0 on aggregate)
1993 CONCACAF Champions' Cup
First Round v.  Acros Real Verdes – 2:1, 3:0 (Real España advance 5:1 on aggregate)
Second Round v.  Club León – 0:0, 0:4 (León advance 4:0 on aggregate)
1995 CONCACAF Champions' Cup
First Round v.  Santos Laguna – 1:1, 2:6 (Santos Laguna advance 7:3 on aggregate)
1997 CONCACAF Champions' Cup
First Round v.  Juventus – 1:0, 1:4 (Juventus advance 4:2 on aggregate)
2000 CONCACAF Champions' Cup
Quarter-Finals v.  Los Angeles Galaxy – 0:0 (Los Angeles Galaxy advance 5:3 on penalties)

Copa Fraternidad
1979 Copa Fraternidad
Group 2 v.  CD Broncos – 1:2
Group 2 v.  Cobán Imperial – 3:2
Group 2 v.  CSD Comunicaciones – 3:2
Group 2 v.  Atlético Marte – 5:3
Group 2 v.  FAS – 5:3
Group 2 v.  CD Broncos – 1:0
Group 2 v.  Cobán Imperial – 2:1
Group 2 v.  CSD Comunicaciones – 1:1
Group 2 v.  Atlético Marte – 1:1
Group 2 v.  FAS – 1:0
Final v.  Aurora F.C. – 0:1, 0:0 (Aurora wins 1:0 on aggregate)
1981 Copa Fraternidad
First Round v.  Alianza FC – 1:0, 1:0 (Real España advance 2:0 on aggregate)
Second Round v.  CD Suchitepéquez – 1:0, 2:1 (Real España advance 3:1 on aggregate)
1982 Copa Fraternidad
First Round v.  CSD Comunicaciones – 1:2, 2:0 (Real España advance 3:2 on aggregate)
Second Round v.  FAS – 3:0, 0:1 (Real España advance 3:1 on aggregate)
Final v.  Xelajú MC – 2:1, 0:0 (Real España wins 2:1 on aggregate)

UNCAF Interclub Cup
2000 UNCAF Interclub Cup
First Round v.  Real Estelí – 2:1
First Round v.  LD Alajuelense – 0:1
First Round v.  LD Alajuelense – 1:1
First Round v.  Real Estelí – 8:0
Second Round v.  Árabe Unido – 2:1
Second Round v.  CSD Comunicaciones – 2:1
Second Round v.  LD Alajuelense – 0:1
Final Round v.  LD Alajuelense – 1:1
Final Round v.  CD Olimpia – 0:2
Final Round v.  CSD Municipal – 3:2
2004 UNCAF Interclub Cup
First Round v.  Real Estelí – 1:1, 3:3 (Real Estelí advance on away goals rule)
2007 UNCAF Interclub Cup
First Round v.  Revolutionary Conquerors – 2:1, 1:2 (Real España advance 4:2 on penalties)
Quarter-Finals v.  LD Alajuelense – 0:0, 2:2 (Alajuelense advance 5:4 on penalties)

Players

Current squad

Reserve team

Managers

  Moisés "Rana de Agua" Canales
  Ernesto Cover
  Eduardo Piña Monsálves
  Roberto Scalessie
  Jorge Chajtur
  Carlos Viera
  Chelato Uclés (1971–75)
  Carlos Padilla (1975–79)
  Néstor Matamala (1980–82)
  Marvin Rodríguez (1982–84)
  Enrique Grey Fúnez (1985–86)
  Ángel Ramón Rodríguez (1986–87)
  Pedro Delgado Zárate (1987–88)
  Flavio Ortega (1988)
  Mario Ramón Sandoval (1989)
  Flavio Ortega (1990)
  Oscar Benítez (1991–92)
  Néstor Matamala (1992–93)
  Ernesto Luzardo (1993)
  Luis Pablo Paz Camargo (1994)
  Héctor Hugo Eugui (1995–97)
  Alberto Romero (1997)
  Flavio Ortega (1997–98)
  Gilberto Yearwood (1998–99)
  Hernán García (1999)
  Daniel Alonzo (2000)
  Ariel Longo (2000–01)
  Rubén Guifarro (2001)
  Leonel Machado (2002)
  Edwin Pavón (2002)
  Juan de Dios Castillo (2003–05)
  Alberto Ordaz (2005)
  Ricardo "Tato" Ortíz (2005–06)
  Carlos Orlando Caballero (2006)
  José Treviño (2007)
  Magdaleno Cano (2007)
  Daniel Uberti (2007)
  Mario Zanabria (2008)
  Ramón Maradiaga (2008–2009)
  Mario Zanabria (2010–12)
  Chelato Uclés (2012)
  Nahúm Espinoza (2012)
  José Treviño (2013)
  Hernán Medford (2013–14) 
  Javier Delgado Prado (2014–2015)
  Hernán Medford (2015)
  Mario Zanabria (2015)
  Miguel Falero (2016)
  Mauro Reyes (2016–17)
  Ramon Maradiaga (2017)
  Martin Garcia (2017–2018)
  Carlos Restrepo (2019)
  Hernán Medford (2019)
  Luis Ordóñez (2019)
  Ramiro Martínez (2019–2020)
  Emilson Soto (2020)
  Raul Gutierrez (2021–2022)
  Emilson Soto (2022)
  Hector Vargas (2022 – Present'')

References

External links

 Official Website
 Official Supporters Website
 

 

 
Real Espana
Association football clubs established in 1929
1929 establishments in Honduras
UNCAF Interclub Cup winning clubs